Parectopa plantaginisella is a moth of the family Gracillariidae. It is known from Québec in Canada and Kentucky, Maine, Michigan, Missouri and Vermont in the United States.

The larvae feed on Erigeron species. They mine the leaves of their host plant. The mine starts as a narrow, winding and linear mine filled with frass. The mine ends in a large bladder-like mine, the upper and lower cuticles being puffed out.

References

External links
 mothphotographersgroup
 Parectopa at microleps.org

Gracillariinae
Moths described in 1872